Legaci is a Filipino American R&B band from the San Francisco Bay Area, California. The current line-up consists of Micah Tolentino(keyboard, vocals), Jason Atencion, Chris Abad, and Del Lazaro (guitar/keyboard/vocals). Their dream was not only to succeed in the music industry, but to give Asian-Americans mainstream relevance. The band released their debut album Little Black Book in 2006 (under a different roster) and continued this momentum with release of Sessions-EP in 2008.

Legaci rose to fame through their YouTube channel with over 140 thousand subscribers and 23 million views. Their cover of Justin Bieber's smash hit "Baby" caught the attention of Bieber and his manager Scooter Braun, and landed Legaci the opportunity to tour the world with the teen sensation as his official backing group. Bieber reserved them a special a capella slot in each of his concerts for Legaci to showcase their talents.  With Bieber they performed in over 30 countries and approximately 300 cities.  As a social networking phenomenon, Legaci maintains over 45 thousand “likes” on Facebook and over 120 thousand combined followers on Twitter as of January 2013.

Their most recent album "Driven-EP" was released on December 11, 2012. The group is currently preparing for their very own world tour as they continue to build their legacy.

History

Early Career (1997–2001) 
Formed in 1997, Legaci's original members consisted of Mathew Arcilla (guitar/vocals), Jason Atencion (vocals), John Daria (vocals), and Micah Tolentino (guitar/keyboard/vocals). The founding members of Legaci got together under the leadership of their late manager, Mike Viernes of Point Blank Entertainment. They performed cover songs and original pieces at various parties, talent shows, cultural events and competitions throughout California. In 2001, Legaci self-published and released their first CD single "Make Sweet Love" with an accompanying music video to promote themselves to their fans as well as potential music industry contacts. The group performed as the opening act for 107.9FM KDND's EndFest at Sacramento, California in 2001 as a result of their first-place victory in a local "Battle of the Bands" competition. They opened for artists such as LFO, Vertical Horizon, Uncle Kracker, Dream, 3LW, and Smash Mouth.

Little Black Book (2002–06) 

Legaci continued to perform seeing the departure of Mathew Arcilla, and the addition of Chris Abad, Jason Guison, and Chris Mamitag. They also worked on recording their first studio album. What started as an independent project soon changed when Kamikaze Records, a local independent label, picked them up in late 2003 and helped to push the release of their album, Little Black Book on March 14, 2006.

Sessions (2006–09) 

Legaci and Kamikaze Records parted ways late 2006. Legaci continued to perform and went back into the studio to start work on their next album, Sessions. With new member Delfin Lazaro, they pushed the Sessions EP in 2007, with plans to finish a full album in the future.

YouTube and Justin Bieber (2007–12) 
In late 2007, Legaci turned to YouTube as a method of promotion to gain more of a fan base and attention.  Over the course of 2 years, their channel has accumulated over 1 million unique views and their videos have cumulatively reached over 34 million views, collaborating with several other rising Asian-American YouTube stars.

Their cover of Bieber's song "Baby" with YouTube users Cathy Nguyen and Traphik, caught the attention of Bieber's music manager Scooter Braun. He contacted them the day after the video was posted, and sent Legaci to start rehearsing the very next week for the promotion run of Bieber's "My World 2.0" album. Since then, the band has performed with Bieber to 30 different countries around the world. Taking a break in the middle of each concert, Bieber introduced Legaci to sing their own mix of a cappella pop melodies.

Driven (2011–present) 
After 2 years of being on the road with Bieber for the My World Tour, Legaci released their debut single entitled "All Day" on December 20, 2011, which was followed by the release of "Never Got Over You" on May 29, 2012. Their Driven EP was released on December 11, 2012. As of 2014 Driven has sold 43 million copies worldwide.

In 2014, they auditioned on Season 9 of America's Got Talent. In their audition, they got praised by the judges and moved onto Judgement Week.

Members

Current members 
 Micah Tolentino - vocals (1997–present)
 Jason Atencion - vocals (1997–2010; 2011–present)
 Chris Abad - vocals (2003–present)
 Del Lazaro - guitar/keyboard/vocals (2006–present)

Previous members 
 Mathew Arcilla (1997–2001)
 John Daria (1997–2000)
 Jason Guison (2002–06)
 Chris Mamitag (2002–06)
 Dominic Manuel (2009–11)
 Ulysses Pastones (1997–99)

Discography 

Studio Albums
 Little Black Book (2006) (Kamikaze Records)
 Sessions (2007) (Legaci)
 Driven EP (December 11, 2012)

Compilations
 Joints Exclusive: Volume 1 (2008) (Phase1 Records)

Singles
 "Make Sweet Love" (2001) (Legaci)
 "All Day" (2011) (Legaci)
 "Never Got Over You" (2012) (Legaci)
 "When You Love Her" (2012) (Legaci)

References

External links 
 

Filipino-American musical groups
Musical groups from the San Francisco Bay Area
Musical groups established in 1997